Fairfield is a home rule-class city in Nelson County, Kentucky, in the United States. The population was 113 at the 2010 census.

History
Originally known as Turkey Town, Fairfield was established by the state assembly in 1818 and incorporated as a city in 1870.

Geography
Roads entering Fairfield include Kentucky Route 48 (Main Street), Kentucky Route 652 (Little Union Road), Murrays Run Road and Wilkerson Road. Kentucky State Route 509 meets 48 a half-mile west of town. It lies in the upper drainage of East Fork Cox Creek, a tributary of the Salt River.

Demographics

As of the 2000 census, there were 72 people, 27 households, and 23 families residing in the city. The racial makeup of the city was 88.89% White and 11.11% African American.

There were 27 households, out of which 40.7% had children under the age of 18 living with them, 59.3% were married couples living together, 25.9% had a female householder with no husband present, and 14.8% were non-families. 14.8% of all households were made up of individuals, and 7.4% had someone living alone who was 65 years of age or older. The average household size was 2.63 and the average family size was 2.83.

In the city the population was spread out, with 25.0% under the age of 18, 8.3% from 18 to 24, 31.9% from 25 to 44, 20.8% from 45 to 64, and 13.9% who were 65 years of age or older. The median age was 40 years. For every 100 females, there were 89.5 males. For every 100 females age 18 and over, there were 86.2 males.

The median income for a household in the city was $19,375, and the median income for a family was $26,250. Males had a median income of $58,750 versus $0 for females. The per capita income for the city was $17,181. None of the population and none of the families were below the poverty line.

References

External links

Cities in Nelson County, Kentucky
Cities in Kentucky
Populated places established in 1818
1818 establishments in Kentucky